Galabets is a railway tunnel under the Galabets ridge in Stara Planina, Bulgaria.

References

Railway tunnels in Bulgaria